Vjačeslavs Duhanovs (born 5 June 1973) is a Latvian modern pentathlete. He competed at the 1992 and 1996 Summer Olympics.

References

1973 births
Living people
Latvian male modern pentathletes
Olympic modern pentathletes of Latvia
Modern pentathletes at the 1992 Summer Olympics
Modern pentathletes at the 1996 Summer Olympics
Sportspeople from Riga